Hydroalkoxylation is a chemical reaction that combines alcohols with alkenes or alkynes. The process affords ethers.

The reaction converts alkenes to dialkyl or aryl-alkyl ethers:
R'OH + RCH=CH2 → R'OCH(R)-CH3
Similarly, alkynes are converted to vinyl ethers:
R'OH + RC≡CH → R'OC(R)=CH2
As shown, the reaction follows the Markovnikov rule. The process exhibits good atom-economy in the sense that no byproducts are produced. The reaction is catalyzed by bases and also by transition metal complexes. Usually symmetrical ethers are prepared by dehydration of alcohols and unsymmetrical ethers by the Williamson ether synthesis from alkyl halides and alkali metal alkoxides.

See also 
 Hydroamination
 Hydrofunctionalization

References

Addition reactions
Homogeneous catalysis
Catalysis